Chau-Chyun Chen is an American engineer and a department of Chemical Engineering chairman at Texas Tech University.

Education 
In 1973, Chen received a BS degree in chemistry from National Taiwan University. In 1977, Chen received a MS degree in Chemical Engineering from Massachusetts Institute of Technology. In 1980, Chen received a Sc.D degree in Chemical Engineering from Massachusetts Institute of Technology.

Career 
Chen is currently the Jack Maddox Distinguished Engineering Chair at Texas Tech University in Lubbock, Texas. Chen is also a published author of over 80 articles in technical journals. Chen is a member of the American Association for the Advancement of Science and American Chemical Society. Chen was also elected a member of the National Academy of Engineering in 2005 for contributions to molecular thermodynamics and process-modeling technology for designing industrial processes with complex chemical systems.

References

Year of birth missing (living people)
Living people
21st-century American engineers
Chinese engineers
Texas Tech University faculty
MIT School of Engineering alumni
National Taiwan University alumni